Utricularia linearis is a carnivorous plant belonging to the genus Utricularia. It is known only from a single unnamed lagoon in Howard Springs, Northern Territory, Australia.

See also 
 List of Utricularia species

References 

Carnivorous plants of Australia
Flora of Australia
linearis
Plants described in 2010